Friendly Fire: The Illusion of Justice, published in 2010, is memoir written by Adam Bereki. The book tells a harrowing story where "truth is stranger than fiction." The story is of an aspiring, young police officer who enters the Huntington Beach police force, but finds himself caught in a disastrous cycle when his colleagues catch wind of his sexual orientation. The situation rapidly unwinds as harassment and threats escalate to a breaking point and the young officer presses a lawsuit against the department.

The case resulted in an internal affairs investigation. None of the officers, including defendants, were placed on administrative leave. The city acknowledged no inappropriate conduct or wrongdoing in this incident however settled with the plaintiff before the court date.

The book is not just a story of work place discrimination or even a story regarding a man's struggle with homophobia. Bereki details the personal and psychological struggles of gay men and women who serve in a compelling manner that includes exploration of self through travel and religion to illustrate his reconciliation with his own identity.

The Surf City Voice summarized the book as a tale of a "brave gay man who survived harassment on the job from macho police officers to ultimately overcome victimhood and find peace with himself."

References 

2010 non-fiction books
2010s LGBT literature
American memoirs
LGBT literature in the United States
LGBT autobiographies